Human ecosystems are human-dominated ecosystems of the anthropocene era that are viewed as complex cybernetic systems by conceptual models that are increasingly used by ecological anthropologists and other scholars to examine the ecological aspects of human communities in a way that integrates multiple factors as economics, sociopolitical organization, psychological factors, and physical factors related to the environment. 

A human ecosystem has three central organizing concepts: human environed unit (an individual or group of individuals), environment, interactions and transactions between and within the components. The total environment includes three conceptually distinct, but interrelated environments: the natural, human constructed, and human behavioral. These environments furnish the resources and conditions necessary for life and constitute a life-support system.

Further reading 

 Basso, Keith 1996 “Wisdom Sits in Places: Landscape and Language among the Western Apache.” Albuquerque: University of New Mexico Press.
 Douglas, Mary 1999 “Implicit Meanings: Selected Essays in Anthropology.” London and New York:  Routledge, Taylor & Francis Group.
 Nadasdy, Paul 2003 “Hunters and Bureaucrats: Power, Knowledge, and Aboriginal-State Relations in the Southwest Yukon.” Vancouver and Toronto: UBC Press.

References

See also 
 Media ecosystem
 Urban ecosystem
 Total human ecosystem

Anthropology
Ecosystems
Environmental sociology
Social systems concepts
Systems biology